Fábio Braz do Nascimento or simply Fábio Braz (born 2 December 1978) is a football player.

Fábio Braz played for Vasco da Gama and Corinthians in the Campeonato Brasileiro.

Fábio Braz played for many clubs throughout Brazil, enjoying success with Vasco da Gama and later after joining Brasiliense in 2012.

References

External links
 CBF 

1978 births
Footballers from São Paulo
Brazilian footballers
Campeonato Brasileiro Série A players
Campeonato Brasileiro Série B players
Associação Atlética Anapolina players
Criciúma Esporte Clube players
Clube 15 de Novembro players
Paraná Clube players
Mogi Mirim Esporte Clube players
Guarani FC players
CR Vasco da Gama players
Sport Club Corinthians Paulista players
Boavista Sport Club players
America Football Club (RJ) players
Duque de Caxias Futebol Clube players
Brasiliense Futebol Clube players
Guaratinguetá Futebol players
Living people
Association football defenders